Haut-Congo Province was a province of the Republic of the Congo (Léopoldville), now the Democratic Republic of the Congo.
It was formed in April 1962 from part of the Orientale Province.
In 1966 it was merged back into the reconstituted Orientale Province.

Location

"Haut Congo" means "Upper Congo", and refers to the province's location on the upper reaches of the Congo River.

History

Haut-Congo Province was formed on 27 April 1962 from part of the Orientale Province, the other parts becoming Ituri Province (later Kibali Ituri) and Uele Province.
On 28 December 1966 the Orientale Province was reconstituted.

Presidents and governors

The heads of Haut-Congo Province were:

References

Sources

Former provinces of the Democratic Republic of the Congo (pre-1966)